Jessica Beinecke [Chinese: 白洁 (Bai Jie)] (born about 1987) is an American educator, entertainer, videographer and online personality in China. She is the founder of production company JM Beinecke, Inc. Her program Jessica白洁 has achieved widespread popularity in China and Taiwan. Her personality and program have been covered in both American and Chinese media. She is a graduate of the E. W. Scripps School of Journalism of Ohio University and received a graduate degree at Middlebury College in Vermont.

PBS said Beinecke is "one of the best-known women in China... China's newest English-language star. Her teaching is very interactive and communicative." In 2012 she won the Association for International Broadcasting (AIB) Founders’ Award for her podcast "OMG! Meiyu".

Beinecke was named on Foreign Policys "Pacific Power Index" as one of the 50 people shaping the future of the US-China relationship "For taking American culture and language viral on the Chinese web...  Beinecke has harnessed the power of social media to teach English — and Chinese — to countless eager language learners."

References

External links
Washington Post: OMG Meiyu a breakout hit web show schools Chinese in American slang
VOA: OMG Meiyu on location in Beijing with Will-i-am of Black-Eyed Peas
PBS.org: OMG Meiyu exports American slang to China
YouTube: OMG Meiyu channel

Living people
American women journalists
Ohio University alumni
1980s births
Date of birth missing (living people)
21st-century American women